Michael D. Curran is a retired politician and former Democratic member of the Illinois House of Representatives from 1983 to 1995. He was born September 23, 1945 in Quincy, Illinois. He earned a bachelor's degree from the University of Illinois at Urbana–Champaign. He retired from the Illinois House of Representatives and ran for Mayor of Springfield, losing to Karen Hasara. He and Vicki Mosley were the last two Democrats to represent Springfield in the Illinois General Assembly until the election of Andy Manar and Sue Scherer to the Illinois Senate and Illinois House, respectively. A year later, he ran for Congress in Illinois's 18th congressional district losing to incumbent Ray LaHood. In 2003, Curran was sentenced to one year in federal prison for abusing his position with the Illinois Secretary of State.

References

1945 births
Living people
People from Quincy, Illinois
Politicians from Springfield, Illinois
University of Illinois Urbana-Champaign alumni
Democratic Party members of the Illinois House of Representatives
Illinois politicians convicted of corruption